is a Japanese voice actor and singer affiliated with Production Ace. In 2013, he won the 7th Seiyu Awards as the Best Rookie actors along with Nobunaga Shimazaki.

Voice acting roles

Anime television series
2009
Seitokai no Ichizon as Yoshiki Nakameguro

2010
Mitsudomoe as Yuudai Chiba

2011
Is This a Zombie? as Fan (episode 12)
Sekai Ichi Hatsukoi as Company Employee (episode 7), Moving Contractor (episode 2)
Nichijou as Tsuyoshi Nakanojō
Mitsudomoe Zōryōchū! as Yuudai Chiba

2012
Another as Yuuya Mochizuki
Mobile Suit Gundam AGE as Kio Asuno

2013
Noucome as Touya Yoshiwara
Majestic Prince as Claine
Genshiken: Second Generation as Kenjiro Hato (as a male)
Blood Lad as Mimic Yoshida
Makai Ouji: Devils and Realist as Amon

2014
Yona of the Dawn as Min-su
Gugure! Kokkuri-san as Yamamoto-kun
The Seven Deadly Sins as Young Gilthunder
Haikyū!! as Mori (episode 1)
Chaika - The Coffin Princess as Leonardo Stoller
Future Card Buddyfight as Tetsuya Kurodake, Dancing Magician
Love Stage!! as Kōsuke Sotomura

2015
Rainy Cocoa, Welcome to Rainy Color as Noel Koga
Cute High Earth Defense Club LOVE! as Yumoto Hakone
Doraemon as Bill Money
Yurikuma Arashi as Life Beauty
Dance with Devils as Loewen (dog)
Future Card Buddyfight 100 as Tetsuya Kurodake

2016
Shōnen Maid as Ibuki
Cute High Earth Defense Club LOVE! LOVE! as Yumoto Hakone
Touken Ranbu: Hanamaru as Midare Tōshirō
D.Gray-man Hallow as Kiredori
Nananin no Ayakashi – Chimi Chimi Mōryō!! Ima Monogatari as Cheruta
Rainy Cocoa in Hawaii as Noel Koga

2017
Kabukibu! as Katsumi Kazuma
Beyblade Burst as Akira Yamabuki
Natsume Yuujinchou Roku as Azuma
Altair: A Record of Battles as Vasco

2018
Gdgd Men's Party as Yomi
Uchi no Oochopus as Kantarō
Skull-face Bookseller Honda-san as Rabbit Head, E Company salesman 
RErideD: Derrida, who leaps through time as Graham
Cute High Earth Defense Club HAPPY KISS! as Yumoto Hakone

2019
The Magnificent Kotobuki as Allen
Midnight Occult Civil Servants as Yuki
Why the Hell are You Here, Teacher!? as Takashi Takahashi
Crayon Shin-chan as Yuzukko A 
Ensemble Stars! as Sora Harukawa

2020
Gleipnir as Isao Kasuga 
Mr. Osomatsu 3 as AI Robots 

2021
I-Chu: Halfway Through the Idol as Momosuke Oikawa
Kuro-Gyaru ni Natta Kara Shinyū to Shite Mita, Shion Chihara
Fairy Ranmaru as Bakkun
How Not to Summon a Demon Lord Ω as Guryun

2022
Lucifer and the Biscuit Hammer as Lance Lumiere
Boruto: Naruto Next Generations as Konashi Nerikiri

OVA
Love Stage!! as Kōsuke Sotomura

Video Games
Touken Ranbu as Midare Toushirou
Ensemble Stars! as Sora Harukawa
I-Chu as Momosuke Oikawa
Sword Art Online: Fatal Bullet as AfasysMega Man 11 as Block Man

DubbingDark Skies as Jesse Barrett (Dakota Goyo)The Lego Movie 2: The Second Part as Finn (Jadon Sand)The Secret Life of Walter Mitty as Rich Melhoff (Marcus Antturi)West Side Story'' as Anybodys (Iris Menas)

Discography

Single

Mini-album

References

External links 
 Official Agency Website
 Official Blog
 Official Twitter

1988 births
Living people
Japanese male video game actors
Japanese male voice actors
Male voice actors from Hyōgo Prefecture
Musicians from Hyōgo Prefecture